Rainfall usually refers to the falling of rain.

Rainfall may also refer to:

 Rain Fall, a 2009 Japanese/Australian action thriller film
 Rainfall, a 2019 song by British rapper Stormzy

See also
 Operation Rainfall, a video game fan campaign founded for Japan-exclusive titles
 Occupation: Rainfall'', a 2020 Australian science fiction action film